Hill & Barlow was a law firm in Boston, Massachusetts that was dissolved in 2002. Founded in 1895, the firm had been one of the city's oldest and most elite firms, and was also the 12th largest in Boston at the time of its dissolution, employing 138 lawyers. The firm was founded by Arthur Hill, known for defending the anarchists Sacco and Vanzetti. Hill & Barlow was dissolved when approximately one third of the firm, mostly the real estate group, left, eventually joining Piper Rudnick (now DLA Piper) in 2003. (A group representing authors and movie producers were the first to leave for Fish & Richardson.) Remaining attorneys reported feeling "blindsided" by the unexpected upheaval, but those departing felt that the planned restructuring was coming too late.

Notable alumni
Notable alumni of the firm include:
Robert Mueller, director of the Federal Bureau of Investigation
 Michael S. Greco, President of the American Bar Association, the Massachusetts Bar Association, the New England Bar Association, and the New England Bar Foundation
 Former Massachusetts governors Endicott Peabody, Michael Dukakis and William Weld
 Deval Patrick, the first African American Governor of Massachusetts and former U.S. assistant attorney general for Civil Rights under Bill Clinton 
 Former federal district court judge Reginald C. Lindsay of the District of Massachusetts
 Former Massachusetts State Senator Jarrett Barrios
 John A. E. Pottow, professor of law at the University of Michigan Law School
 Herbert P. Gleason, former corporation counsel of Boston
 Richard W. Renehan, President of the Boston Bar Association, President of Boston College Alumni

References

External links
Esq. RIP
Boston Business Journal
Anatomy of a breakup Hill & Barlow employees analyze firm’s demise, impact

Law firms based in Massachusetts
Defunct law firms of the United States
Law firms established in 1895
Companies disestablished in 2002
Defunct companies based in Massachusetts
Companies based in Boston
1895 establishments in Massachusetts